The 61st annual Berlin International Film Festival was held from 10 to 20 February 2011, with actress Isabella Rossellini as the President of the Jury. The Coen Brothers film True Grit opened the festival. 300,000 tickets were sold in total during the event, to 20,000 attendees from 116 countries, including 3900 members of the press. German actor Armin Mueller-Stahl received the Honorary Golden Bear for lifetime achievement. The Golden Bear for Best Film went to the Iranian film Nader and Simin, A Separation, directed by Asghar Farhadi, which also served as the closing film at the festival.

Competition

Jury
The following people were announced as being on the jury for the festival:

International jury
 Isabella Rossellini, actress (Italy) - Jury President
 Jan Chapman, producer (Australia)
 Nina Hoss, actress (Germany)
 Aamir Khan, actor, director, screenwriter and producer (India)
 Guy Maddin, director and screenwriter (Canada)
 Sandy Powell, costume designer (United Kingdom)

In addition, the festival held a place open in the jury for the imprisoned Iranian director Jafar Panahi, "to signalize its support for his struggle for freedom".

Best First Feature Award Jury
 Bettina Brokemper, producer (Germany)
 Assaf Gavron, writer and musician (Israel)
 Michèle Ohayon, director, screenwriter and producer (Morocco)

International Short Film Jury
 Nan Goldin, photographer (United States)
 Ibrahim Letaief, director, screenwriter and producer (Tunisia)
 Renen Schorr, director, screenwriter and producer (Israel)

In competition
The following films were selected to be in competition for the Golden Bear and Silver Bear awards:

Out of competition
The following films were screened out of competition at the festival:

Panorama
The following films were screened in the Main Programme of the Panorama section:

Forum
The following films were screened in the Main Programme of the Forum section:

Berlinale Shorts

Jury
 Nan Goldin, American photographer
 Renen Schorr, Israeli director
 Ibrahim Letaief, Tunisian director and producer

Films
The following films were selected to be in competition for the Golden Bear for Best Short Film:

Key
{| class="wikitable" width="550" colspan="1"
| style="background:#FFDEAD;" align="center"| †
|Winner of the main award for best film in its section
|-
| colspan="2"| The opening and closing films are screened during the opening and closing ceremonies respectively.
|}

Awards

The following prizes were awarded by the Jury:

Golden Bear for Best Film: Nader and Simin, A Separation by Asghar Farhadi

Silver Bears
 Jury Grand Prix: The Turin Horse by Béla Tarr
 Best Director:  for Sleeping Sickness
 Best Actress: the actress ensemble of Nader and Simin, A Separation
 Best Actor: the actor ensemble of Nader and Simin, A Separation
 Outstanding Artistic Contribution (Production Design): Barbara Enriquez for The Prize
 Outstanding Artistic Contribution (Camera): Wojciech Staron for The Prize
 Best Script: Joshua Marston and Andamion Murataj for The Forgiveness of Blood
 Alfred Bauer Prize for a work of particular innovation: If Not Us, Who? by Andres Veiel

Honorary Golden Bear
 Armin Mueller-Stahl

Crystal Bears
 Generation Kplus (Feature Length Film): The Liverpool Goalie by Arild Andresen
 Generation14plus (Feature Length Film): On the Ice by Andrew Okpeaha MacLean

FIPRESCI Prizes
Competition: The Turin Horse by Béla Tarr
Panorama: Top Floor Left Wing by Angelo Cianci
Forum: Heaven's Story by Takahisa Zeze

Golden Bear for Best Short Film: Night Fishing by Park Chan-wook and Park Chan-kyong

References

External links

Yearbook 2011 at berlinale.de
 61st Berlin International Film Festival 2011
Berlin International Film Festival:2011 at Internet Movie Database

61
2011 film festivals
2011 festivals in Europe
2011 in Berlin
Berl